Segundo Rolando Torino Flores (10 July 1929 – 24 October 2018), known as Rolando Torino, was a Chilean football manager and footballer.

Early years
Born in Caleta Río Seco, Iquique, Torino belonged to a well-known sports family from that city bound to Club Rápido. He played football for the youth team of Iquique (1945–46), but he also reinforced the senior teams of both Copiapó (1947–48) and Chillán (1949–50).

Playing career
In 1951, he made his professional debut in Universidad de Chile. Next he played for Colo-Colo (1952) and Instituto O'Higgins (1953, later O'Higgins F.C.).

Coaching career
He mainly developed his extensive career in Central America. 

Following his retirement as a footballer, Torino began his coaching career as the assistant coach of Luis Álamos in Universidad de Chile and after worked as coach of the youth system and caretaker for the first team from 1959 to 1961. In Chile, he also coached , San Antonio Unido, Trasandino, Audax Italiano, Colchagua, Soinca Bata, Naval and Unión La Calera. For San Antonio Unido, he was the first coach in its professional history from 1962 to 1963, becoming the runner-up in the 1962 Segunda División.

At national teams level, he coached the Chile national amateur team in 1966.

Torino came to Guatemala to coach  in the Liga Nacional de Fútbol at the beginning of the 1970s. In that country, he also coached Juventud Retalteca, Antigua GFC, Xelajú MC, Deportivo Zacapa, Tipografía Nacional, Municipal, Deportivo Amatitlán, Deportivo Coatepeque and Heredia Jaguares.

He is one of the five Chilean coaches who have led Municipal along with Luis Grill Prieto, Jaime Hormazábal, Javier Mascaró and Fernando Díaz. During his stint with Municipal, he led the team in two derbies against Comunicaciones, with draws as results. 

In the 1980s and the 1990s, he led Juventud Olímpica, Dragón and Águila in El Salvador and  Marathón in Honduras. He also had stints with clubs in the United States.

In Guatemala, he also worked as a teller for future football managers along with his Chilean colleague Jaime Hormazábal and as a coach for holiday football academies.

Personal life
Born in Iquique, he moved to Santiago and attended the Abelardo Núñez Normal School, where he graduated as a PE teacher in 1951. 

He made his home in Guatemala and his grandsons, Pablo and Javier Melgar Torino, were Guatemalan professional football defenders.

He died of natural causes on 23 October 2018 in Guatemala City and his body was cremated.

References

External links
 Rolando Torino at PlaymakerStats

1929 births
2018 deaths
People from Iquique
Chilean people of Italian descent
Chilean footballers
Universidad de Chile footballers
Colo-Colo footballers
O'Higgins F.C. footballers
Chilean Primera División players
Primera B de Chile players
Chilean football managers
Universidad de Chile managers
Trasandino de Los Andes managers
Chile national football team managers
Audax Italiano managers
Deportes Colchagua managers
Deportes Melipilla managers
Deportes Naval managers
Antigua GFC managers
Club Xelajú MC managers
Unión La Calera managers
C.S.D. Municipal managers
C.D. Águila managers
C.D. Marathón managers
Primera B de Chile managers
Chilean Primera División managers
Chilean expatriate football managers
Chilean expatriate sportspeople in Guatemala
Chilean expatriate sportspeople in El Salvador
Chilean expatriate sportspeople in Honduras
Chilean expatriate sportspeople in the United States
Expatriate football managers in Guatemala
Expatriate football managers in El Salvador
Expatriate football managers in Honduras
Expatriate soccer managers in the United States